NWSC may refer to:

 National Water and Sewerage Corporation, a water supply and sanitation company in Uganda.
 Neighbourhood and Worker's Service Centre, a pro-democracy political group in Hong Kong
 National Water Sports Centre, Holme Pierrepont, Nottingham, England